The Chinese Cultural Centre is a Chinese community centre, museum, and municipal archives facility located in Vancouver Chinatown. It was founded in 1973 and opened to the public in 1980. It houses the Chinese Canadian Military Museum Society on the second floor.

In April 2020, the facility was vandalized with graffiti that is linked to the COVID-19 pandemic in British Columbia.

References

Sources 
 
 

1973 establishments in British Columbia
Organizations based in Vancouver
Chinese-Canadian culture in Vancouver
Chinese Canadian organizations